Gunnar Nils Thoresen (21 July 1920 – 30 September 2017) was one of the greatest Norwegian footballers in the 1940s and 1950s. A forward, played 64 matches and scored 22 goals for the Norway national team and took part in the 1952 Summer Olympics. His last appearance for Norway came on 28 June 1959, less than a month before his 39th birthday, making him the oldest-ever Norwegian player to play for his national team.

On club level Thoresen spent his entire career with Larvik Turn. He made his first-team debut for the club on 17 May 1937, in a match against Lisleby. He lost four seasons of his career (1941–1944) because of World War II, but quickly established himself among the best players in Norway when organized football resumed in 1945, and made his international debut against Denmark on 16 June 1946.

As a member of Larvik Turn, Thoresen became league champion in 1952–53, 1954–55 and 1955–56. In addition he won the top scorer title twice. He scored 91 goals in 116 matches in the Norwegian top division, an average of 0.78 goals per match. He played his last match for Larvik Turn in 1962, having scored a total of 425 goals in 472 first-team matches for the club (including friendlies). This makes him the highest-scoring Norwegian footballer of all-time.

Thoresen is the father of Hallvar Thoresen, who also became a Norwegian international footballer, played professionally for FC Twente and PSV Eindhoven in the Netherlands, and is regarded as one of Norway's best players in the 1980s. Gunnar was capped 64 times, while Hallvar was played 50 internationals, making them Norway's second-most capped father-son combination, behind Odd and Steffen Iversen who were capped a combined 124 times.

Gunnar Thoresen died on 30 September 2017, at the age of 97.

Honours
Larvik Turn
Norwegian top division: 1952–53, 1954–55, 1955–56

Individual
Norwegian top division top scorer: 1952–53, 1953–54

References

External links
 

1920 births
2017 deaths
Norwegian footballers
Association football forwards
Norway international footballers
Larvik Turn players
Eliteserien players
People from Larvik
Footballers at the 1952 Summer Olympics
Olympic footballers of Norway
Sportspeople from Vestfold og Telemark